Urania Records, Inc. was an American record label founded April 15, 1951, by Czech-born New York industrialist Rudolf Koppl (1895–1956), who served as its founding president.

History 
Urania Records initially released opera recordings from East Germany.  The label was later run by Rudolph's son, Werner J. Koppl (1923–1996), also Czech-born, who, on March 23, 1956, sold Urania to American Sound Corporation – Daken Karl Broadhead (1905–1999), chairman; and Siegfried Bart (né Siegfried Gerold Bart; 1913–1997), president.  American Sound was a joint venture of Allied Record Manufacturing Company (founded 1933) of Hollywood and Bart Manufacturing Company of Belleville, New Jersey. American Sound took over actual operations of Urania April 16, 1956. In 1958, American Sound Corporation sold Urania Records to Bart Manufacturing Corporation, which henceforth ran Urania as its subsidiary based in Belleville, New Jersey.  Simultaneously in 1958, American Sound, itself, was sold to Allied Record Manufacturing Company, which was headed by Daken Karl Broadhead from 1945 to 1979 as president and principal owner. In 1979, Allied was sold to Warner Communications and became part of WEA Manufacturing.

Disambiguation 
Urania Records of this article is not to be confused with the Italian-based classical label, Urania Records, founded in 1998.

References 

Record labels established in 1951
Classical music record labels
Jazz record labels
New Jersey record labels
Mail-order retailers
Defunct record labels of the United States
Belleville, New Jersey
1951 establishments in New York (state)